The 2019 Winnipeg Blue Bombers season was the 62nd season for the team in the Canadian Football League (CFL) and their 87th season overall. This was the sixth season under head coach Mike O'Shea and the sixth full season under general manager Kyle Walters. The Blue Bombers qualified for the playoffs for the fourth consecutive season on September 21, 2019 following an Ottawa Redblacks loss. The club later would go on to win their 11th Grey Cup championship and their first since the 1990 Grey Cup championship game, ending what was the longest active Grey Cup drought.

Offseason

Foreign drafts
For the first time in its history, the CFL held drafts for foreign players from Mexico and Europe. Like all other CFL teams, the Blue Bombers held three non-tradeable selections in the 2019 CFL–LFA Draft, which took place on January 14, 2019. The 2019 European CFL Draft took place on April 11, 2019 where all teams held one non-tradeable pick.

CFL draft
The 2019 CFL Draft took place on May 2, 2019. The Blue Bombers held nine selections in the eight-round draft after acquiring the BC Lions' first-round pick in a trade which included their own first-round pick from the 2018 CFL Draft.

Preseason

Schedule

Regular season

Standings

Schedule

Post-season

Schedule

Team

Roster

Coaching staff

References

Winnipeg Blue Bombers seasons
2019 Canadian Football League season by team
2019 in Manitoba
Grey Cup championship seasons